The Uranus Orbiter and Probe is an orbiter mission concept to study Uranus and its moons. The orbiter would also deploy an atmospheric probe to characterize Uranus's atmosphere. The concept is being developed as a potential large strategic science mission for NASA. The current proposal targets a launch in 2031 using a Falcon Heavy expendable launch vehicle with a gravity assist at Jupiter allowing arrival at Uranus in 2044. The science phase would last 4.5 years and include multiple flybys of each of the major moons.

The mission concept was selected as the highest priority Flagship-class mission by the 2023–2032 Planetary Science Decadal Survey, ahead of the Enceladus Orbilander.
A Neptune orbiter mission concept, Neptune Odyssey, that would address many of the same scientific goals regarding ice giants was also considered, but for logistical and cost reasons a mission to Uranus was favored.

Background

Voyager 2 is the only space probe to have visited the Uranus system, completing a flyby on January 24, 1986. The 2011-2022 Planetary Science Decadal Survey recommended a Flagship-class orbiter mission to an ice giant with priority behind what would become the Mars 2020 rover and the Europa Clipper. Ice giants are now appreciated as a common type of exoplanet, precipitating the need for further study of ice giants in the Solar System. The ice giants Uranus and Neptune were seen as unique yet equally compelling scientific targets, but a Uranus orbiter and atmospheric probe was given preference for logistical and cost reasons. A Uranus orbiter would logically follow Flagship-class orbiter missions undertaken at Jupiter and Saturn (Galileo and Cassini, respectively).

In 2017, prior to the 2023–2032 survey, a committee narrowed twenty mission concepts to three scenarios for Uranus and a fourth for Neptune. A mission to Neptune is viewed by some to be of greater scientific merit because Triton, likely a captured Kuiper belt object and ocean world, is a more compelling astrobiology target than the moons of Uranus (though Ariel and Miranda in particular are possible ocean worlds). There was also a study that considered a New Frontiers-level Uranus orbiter mission concept if a Flagship-class mission to Neptune were favored. Nevertheless, again due to cost and logistical considerations including launch vehicle availability and available launch windows, the 2023–2032 Planetary Science Decadal Survey recommended the Uranus Orbiter and Probe instead of an analogous proposal for Neptune, Neptune Odyssey.

Key science questions
The orbiter paired with an atmospheric probe will address a variety of scientific questions across all aspects of the Uranus system:

Origin, interior, and atmosphere
How does atmospheric circulation function, from interior to thermosphere, in an ice giant?
What is the 3D atmospheric structure of the weather layer?
When, where, and how did Uranus form, how did it evolve both thermally and spatially, including migration, and how did it acquire its retrograde obliquity?
What is Uranus' bulk composition and its depth dependence?
Does Uranus have discrete layers or a dilute core, and can this be tied to its formation and tilt?
What is the true rotation rate of Uranus, does it rotate uniformly, and how deep are the winds?

Magnetosphere
What dynamo process produces Uranus' complex magnetic field?
What are the plasma sources & dynamics of Uranus' magnetosphere and how does it interact with the solar wind, Uranus' upper atmosphere, and satellite surfaces?

Satellites and rings
What are the internal structures and rock-to-ice ratios of the large Uranian moons and which moons possess substantial internal heat sources or possible oceans?
How do the compositions and properties of the Uranian moons constrain their formation and evolution?
What geological history and processes do the surfaces record and how can they inform outer solar system impactor populations? What evidence of exogenic interactions do the surfaces display?
What are the compositions, origins and history of the Uranian rings and inner small moons, and what processes sculpted them into their current configuration?

Mission details
The atmospheric probe element of this mission would study the vertical distribution of cloud-forming molecules, thermal stratification, and wind speed as a function of depth.

Orbiter instruments
The orbiter is proposed to carry the following instruments in the baseline concept, with additional instruments possible should they prove to be within mass, power, and cost limitations:

Atmospheric probe instruments
The atmospheric probe is proposed to carry 4 scientific instruments as part of the baseline concept.

See also
Atmosphere of Uranus
Exploration of Uranus
Moons of Uranus
Uranus mission proposals
 MUSE
 Oceanus (New Frontiers-class proposal of the 2010s)
 ODINUS
 Uranus Pathfinder (ESA M-Class proposal of the 2010s)

References

Missions to Uranus
Proposed NASA space probes
Orbiters (space probe)